The Greyhound class was a development of the , and comprised two 17-gun wooden screw sloops.  They were both launched in 1859 and saw service with the Royal Navy until 1870. The class was reclassified as corvettes in 1862.

Design
The Greyhound class were a lengthened version of the wooden sloops of the Cruizer class, with an uprated steam engine. The combination of greater length (allowing greater hydrodynamic efficiency) and more power gave an increase in top speed from 6 knots in the Cruizers to 10 knots in the Greyhounds.

Propulsion

Sail plan
Both ships of the class were built with a barque-rig sail plan.

Armament
Both ships of the class were provided with five 40-pounder breech-loading guns and twelve 32-pounder muzzle-loading smoothbore carriage guns in a broadside arrangement.

Ships

Operational histories

HMS Greyhound

Greyhound was commissioned at Plymouth on 6 February 1860 and served in the Mediterranean until 1861.  From 1861 to 1864 she was sent  to the North America and West Indies Station, and during her commission from 1865 to 1869 she served on the west coast of Africa and the south-east coast of South America.  She was reduced to harbour service in 1869, and in 1871 and 1872 she conducted hydrodynamic experiments to support the work of William Froude.  By 1879 she was being used as a breakwater at Devonport, and she was eventually sold on 3 April 1906.

HMS Mutine

Mutine was commissioned at Woolwich on 26 November 1859 and, apart from a refit at Woolwich in 1864 - 1865, served her entire career on the Pacific Station. She paid off at Sheerness on 30 March 1869 and was sold on 26 February 1870 for commercial use.  She was renamed Chieftain by her new owners.

References

 
Ship classes of the Royal Navy
Sloop classes
 Greyhound
 Greyhound
1859 ships